Esmeralda Peaks is a  multi-summit mountain located in Kittitas County of Washington state. Esmeralda Peaks are in the Teanaway area of the Wenatchee Mountains. Precipitation runoff from the peaks drains into tributaries of the Teanaway River. This mountain's name has also been spelled Esmerelda Peaks, however Esmeralda was officially adopted in 1966 by the U.S. Board on Geographic Names.

Climate

Lying east of the Cascade crest, the area around Hawkins Mountain is a bit drier than areas to the west. Summers can bring warm temperatures and occasional thunderstorms. Most weather fronts originate in the Pacific Ocean, and travel east toward the Cascade Mountains. As fronts approach, they are forced upward by the peaks of the Cascade Range, causing them to drop their moisture in the form of rain or snowfall onto the Cascades (Orographic lift). As a result, the eastern slopes of the Cascades experience lower precipitation than the western slopes. During winter months, weather is usually cloudy, but, due to high pressure systems over the Pacific Ocean that intensify during summer months, there is often little or no cloud cover during the summer.

See also

 Geology of the Pacific Northwest

References

External links
 Esmeralda Peaks: weather forecast
 Esmeralda Peaks drone video: YouTube
 Climbing Esmeralda Peak: YouTube

Gallery

Mountains of Kittitas County, Washington
Mountains of Washington (state)
Wenatchee National Forest
Cascade Range
North American 2000 m summits